Andrey Bobrov (born 13 June 1964) is a Soviet speed skater. He competed in the men's 1500 metres event at the 1988 Winter Olympics.

References

1964 births
Living people
Soviet male speed skaters
Olympic speed skaters of the Soviet Union
Speed skaters at the 1988 Winter Olympics
Sportspeople from Omsk